born  on August 17, 1974 in Tokyo), is a Japanese pop singer. She is famous for working with Tetsuya Komuro who gave her much success in the 1990s, which led to her deep dip in popularity after 1999, the year in which she released her first non-TK produced album, One Fine Day. Tomomi Kahara and Tetsuya Komuro dated for a few years, but they suffered from personal problems which led to their breakup. After a period of sickness, Kahara's talent agency terminated her contract on June 29, 2007.

Biography

Before 1995: Early life and career 
Kahara was born in Koto, Tokyo in 1974.  She attended Showa Gakuin Elementary, Shoin Junior, and Senior High School.  She started her horse-riding lesson when she was three, and later received the 4th place in the National Sports Festival of Japan in 1992.   Before she started her career as a singer, she worked as a model, and appeared in fashion magazines such as CanCam and Vivi as well as TV shows.

1995–1997: Rise to fame 
While working with Tetsuya Komuro, her first single "Keep Yourself Alive", was released in late 1995. It sold over 360,000 copies and went Top 10, peaking at No. 8. Her second single, "I Believe", was her first million-seller and added to her popularity. In March 1996, she released the single "I'm Proud" which peaked at No. 2 and was her best-selling single. It outsold Namie Amuro's singles released that year. In June 1996, she finally released her first album, Love Brace, a collection of songs about love and stated by Tetsuya Komuro to be his best work to date.  It was a huge success selling over 2.5 million copies, half of them within the first week of release.

Already a big star, she and Tetsuya Komuro became an item and she continued to release singles, all peaking at 1. In December 1997, she finally released her second album, Storytelling. It went to the top of the charts and sold 1.37 million copies, much less than the 2.5 million copies that her previous album has sold.

1998–1999: Decline 
Since the release of Storytelling, her popularity began to decline and her relationship with her mentor, Tetsuya Komuro, was in every tabloid. Gossip magazines rumored that both of them were abusing drugs and that their relationship was beginning to fall apart. Her next single tumblin dice went only to the number-two position. Her music did not reach the top position again. Her next album, nine cubes, sold a depressing 261,000 copies, much less than her first two albums.

Her breakup with Tetsuya Komuro, frequent scandals, and suicide attempts shed her in a negative light in the conservative Japanese media. She finally left her record company, who released a compilation which sold well, over 600,000 copies and debuted at No. 1. At that time, gossip magazines were labeling rising-star, Ami Suzuki, as Kahara's replacement.

After some time relaxing after the scandals, Tomomi Kahara resumed her career at Warner writing her own lyrics.

1999–2006: Post-Tetsuya Komuro 
After Komuro, Kahara worked with a variety of producers at Warner Music Japan, including American Andy Marvel (Diana King, Jessica Simpson) and recorded songs by Gary Carolla (N Sync) and Vincent Degiorgio (N Sync, Atomic Kitten, Love, Inc., Mink, Nakano Mori Band) which appeared on her albums One Fine Day and Love Again, released in 1999 and 2001, respectively.

In 2004, Kahara signed with Universal Music Japan. Her most recent recordings for Universal Music Japan have shown her in a dazzling and sultry light with some of her best vocal performances to date. She covered some of her biggest hits and also recorded new songs from Korean and Japanese composers as well as pop standards such as "Ben", a cover version of the song by Michael Jackson. Her best-selling album at Universal sold a little over 50,000 copies and her latest album, Naked, sold only 12,000 copies, but she was still be seen in the media.

In 2006, after years of average fame, Tomomi Kahara returned briefly to the spotlight. She starred in a musical and her latest photobook, Crystallize II, which came with two strawberry condoms, sold unexpectedly well. She was one of the voice actors for the 'Sound of Music' Japanese DVD and she sang the theme song for a NHK Taiga drama.

2007–present: hiatus and comeback announced 
On June 29, 2007, Kahara canceled her contract with Ogipro after repeated personal problems affected her professional appearances. After this, she went on a hiatus, and it was unsure if she would return.

On November 4, 2008, Tetsuya Komuro was arrested, and Japanese weekly magazine Josei Jishin reported that Kahara was shocked by his arrest and suffered from insomnia.

On January 17, 2009, she was taken to a hospital reportedly because she took excessive amounts of tranquilizers.

On October 30, 2011, she announced that will make a return to the entertainment industry. She has taken vocal lessons and acting classes.

End of 2012, she made her return by live FNS TV program.

On April 17, 2013, she released new single. Dreamed a Dream

On June 26, 2013, she released new album. Dream – self cover Best

In August 2013, following the suicide of Hikaru Utada's mother, Kahara generated controversy when she stated that she wished to make a song about the event. Her comment was criticized as being insensitive.

In 2016, Kahara made an appearance as a guest artist at the Japanese touring ice show Fantasy on Ice, where she performed live in collaboration with various figure skaters at the tour stops in Makuhari and Sapporo.

Discography

Singles 
 "Keep yourself alive" September 8, 1995
 "I believe" October 11, 1995
 "I'm proud" March 6, 1996 No. 2 1,372,420 copies sold
 "Love Brace" July 22, 1996
 "Save your dream" October 2, 1996 808,570 copies sold
 "Hate tell a lie" April 23, 1997 1,058,610 copies sold
 "Love is all music" July 2, 1997 653,000 copies sold
 "Tanoshiku Tanoshiku" Yasashikune September 18, 1997
 "I wanna go" February 11, 1998
 "You Don't give up" April 8, 1998
 "tumblin' dice" June 17, 1998
 "here we are" July 29, 1998
 "Daily News" October 14, 1998
 "as A person" July 22, 1999
 "Be Honest" October 27, 1999
 "Believe in Future" February 23, 2000
 "Blue Sky" July 26, 2000
 "Never Say Never" April 18, 2001
 "Precious" August 8, 2001
 "Anata no Kakera" October 24, 2001
 "Akiramemashou" April 24, 2002
 "Pleasure" February 26, 2003
 "Anata Ga Ireba" September 28, 2004
 "Namida No Tsuzuki" May 24, 2005
 "Hana/Keep on Running" February 22, 2006
 "Ano sayonara ni sayonara wo" July 5, 2006
 "Yume Yaburete -I Dreamed a Dream-" April 17, 2013

Albums 
 Love Brace June 3, 1996
 Storytelling December 24, 1997 1,365,860 copies sold
 Nine cubes November 26, 1998
 Kahara Compilation February 10, 1999 695,730 copies sold
 One Fine Day November 25, 1999
 Best Selection September 27, 2001
 Love Again November 21, 2001
 Natural Breeze – Kahala Best 1998-2002- July 17, 2002
 Naked July 17, 2005
 Super Best Singles~10th Anniversary December 14, 2005
 Dream: Self Cover Best June 26, 2013

DVD 
 Tomomi Kahara First Live December 12, 2001
 very best of Music ClipsMarch 27, 2002
 10th Anniversary Celebration Concert 2005 December 7, 2005

Books 
 Mirai wo Shinjite January 27, 2000
 Ku ari Raku ari: Mirai wo Shinjite Part 2 July 25, 2001
 ShowbizDecember 12, 2001
 Crystallize December 20, 2005
 Crystallize II March 27, 2006

References

External links 
  by Universal Music Japan 
 Official profile by Production Ogi 
 Official profile by Warner Music Japan 

1974 births
Japanese idols
Japanese television personalities
Japanese women pop singers
Japanese actresses
Living people
Universal Music Japan artists
Warner Music Japan artists
Singers from Tokyo
Fantasy on Ice guest artists
21st-century Japanese singers
21st-century Japanese women singers